The 7th Mechanized Brigade ("Dukelská") is an Mechanized infantry brigade of the Czech Army based in Hranice. It is the Czech Army main heavy ground fighting unit for defence of Czech Republic and for EU and NATO alliance forces. It operates T-72M4CZ, T-72M1 and Leopard 2A4 main battle tanks and BVP-2 infantry fighting vehicles. For fire support it uses SPM-85 PRAM-S and M1982 PRAM-L 120mm mortars.

History
Activated on 1 October 1994 as a direct successor of 3rd Mechanized Division in Kroměříž during transformation of Czech Army from system of divisions to brigade sized units. It traces its roots to the 3rd Czechoslovak Independent Brigade in USSR during WWII that was transformed into the 3rd Infantry Division in Kroměříž.

At the time of creation, it was combined arms unit with 4 mechanized infantry battalions, reconnaissance battalion, anti-tank battalion, engineering battalion and units of air defense, artillery, signal, medical and support forces.

In 2003 the brigade was transformed to pure mechanized infantry unit and the HQ was moved to barracks in Hranice. At the end of the 2003 it composed of 2 mechanized infantry battalions (71st and 72nd) and 1 combined mechanized battalion (73rd), that was in 2005 transformed to armored. In 2008 new unit was formed from disbanded 155th rescue battalion, the 74th light motorized infantry battalion in Bučovice that was equipped with Iveco LMV vehicles.

Structure
The 7th Mechanized Brigade consist of the following elements in 2023. Each battalion have one company of active reserves in its structure.
Headquarters (Hranice)
71st Mechanized Battalion "Sibiřský" (Hranice) (BVP-2)
72nd Mechanized Battalion "Generálmajora Josefa Buršíka" (Přáslavice) (BVP-2)
73rd Armored Battalion "Hanácký" (Přáslavice) (T-72M4CZ, T-72M1, Leopard 2A4)
74th Mechanized Battalion "Plukovníka Bohuslava Malečka" (Bučovice) (BVP-2)

References

Military of the Czech Republic
Military units and formations of the Czech Republic
Group sized units of armies (land forces)